Miles Killebrew (born May 10, 1993) is an American football safety for the Pittsburgh Steelers of the National Football League (NFL). He played college football at Southern Utah. He was drafted by the Detroit Lions in the fourth round of the 2016 NFL Draft, and played for the team from 2016 to 2020.

College career
Killebrew reached the triple-digit mark in tackles each of his last two seasons (101 in 2014, 132 in 2015) and also showed an ability to handle pass coverage responsibilities with three interceptions (one returned for a touchdown in 2014) and seven pass breakups in 2015. The four-year starter earned All-Big Sky recognition in each season: honorable mention in 2012 and 2013, second-team in 2014, and first-team in 2015.

Professional career

Pre-draft
NFL analysts had projected Killebrew to be drafted in the third or fourth rounds. Most teams and scouts were impressed by his size, tackling form, and physical play. The only downsides to him were his lack of instincts, minimal coverage range, and lack of anticipation in run direction. With a large frame for a safety and the popularity of hybrid linebackers in the NFL, a lot of analysts expected him to also play a nickel linebacker role in the NFL. Killebrew played in the Reese's Senior Bowl and was also invited to the NFL combine. Between the Senior Bowl and the combine, it was reported he met with multiple teams, including the Cincinnati Bengals, Dallas Cowboys, San Diego Chargers, New York Jets, Detroit Lions, and the Indianapolis Colts' head coach Chuck Pagano. On March 30, 2016, he attended Southern Utah's first ever Pro Day and performed the 40-yard dash (4.51), 20-yard dash (2.63), and 10-yard dash (1.58), improving his numbers from the combine on all three. Over twenty scouts and representatives from NFL teams showed up to evaluate Killebrew and ten other prospects at SUU's Pro Day

Detroit Lions

The Detroit Lions selected Killebrew in the fourth round (111th overall) in the 2016 NFL Draft. After he had appeared in the senior bowl, the Detroit Lions' safeties coach, Alan Williams, and other representatives from the organization had a meeting with Killebrew and told him that they were not interested in him, he wasn't a right fit for the team, and that they did not want him at all. Once they drafted him, they told him that they had said it to only see how he would respond.

2016 season

On May 6, 2016, it was reported that the Detroit Lions had signed Killebrew to a four-year, $2.34 million contract that includes a signing bonus of $578,564.

He began his rookie season as the Lions' third strong safety on the depth chart behind veterans Tavon Wilson and Rafael Bush. In the first 11 games, Killebrew mainly saw time on special teams and saw a few snaps as a rotational safety on defense. On November 20, 2016, Killebrew led the Lions with five tackles, while only playing 12 defensive snaps, all on third down, during the Detroit Lions 26-19 victory over the Jacksonville Jaguars. Four days later, he made four tackles on third down, while only appearing on nine of the Lions' defensive snaps during their 16-13 victory over the Minnesota Vikings on Thanksgiving.

On December 4, 2016, he played 21 defensive snaps (34%) during the Detroit Lions 28-13 victory against the New Orleans Saints. He finished the game with three solo tackles, a pass deflection, and intercepted Drew Brees for his first career interception.

2017 season
On September 10, 2017, in the Lions' season opening 35–23 victory over the Arizona Cardinals, Killebrew had a 35-yard interception return for a touchdown, which came off of quarterback Carson Palmer, in the fourth quarter.

2018 season
During training camp Killebrew converted to linebacker with the arrival of Matt Patricia and new defensive scheme.

2020 season
On March 24, 2020, Killebrew re-signed with the Lions.

Pittsburgh Steelers
Killebrew signed a one-year contract with the Pittsburgh Steelers on March 24, 2021.

On March 11, 2022, Killebrew signed a two-year, $4 million contract extension with the Steelers.

Personal life
Killebrew was raised by his parents, Lisa and David Killebrew, in Henderson, Nevada. Killebrew and his family are Indianapolis Colts fans, as they lived in Indiana for a few years. He also cites his role models in football as Troy Polamalu, Earl Thomas, and Bob Sanders.

On April 30, 2016, Killebrew graduated from Southern Utah University with a degree in engineering. He received the phone call from the Detroit Lions telling him they'd drafted him on the way to his graduation ceremony.

In June 2016, a Detroit-based brewery named Fort Street Brewery created Killebrew IPA, a play on words using his last name.

References

External links
 Southern Utah Thunderbirds bio
 Detroit Lions bio

1993 births
Living people
American football safeties
Detroit Lions players
People from Henderson, Nevada
Pittsburgh Steelers players
Players of American football from Nevada
Southern Utah Thunderbirds football players
Sportspeople from the Las Vegas Valley